Éric Mouquet (born 19 March 1960 in Valenciennes, France), is the co-founder of the band Deep Forest. He won a Grammy Award in 1995, and a World Award for best world music album.

The other half of Deep Forest is Michel Sanchez.

Mouquet has composed and produced for different artists such as Josh Groban (Closer), (Awake), Ana Torroja (Mecano), Mell (Japan), Chitose Hajime (Japan), Sa Dingding (Deep China).

In June 2008, he started a new label called Deep Projects, to promote music inspired by travel and the meeting with musicians from around the world. Albums that Mouquet has worked on include Deep Brasil (released 2008), Deep Africa (released June 2013), Deep China (featuring Sa Dingding, currently unreleased), Deep Sky(currently unreleased) and Deep India (released February 2013 feat. Rahul Sharma).

References

External links 
 Deep Forest website

1960 births
Living people
French musicians
People from Valenciennes